Evergreen High School is a public high school in the JEFFCO Public Schools district in Evergreen, Colorado, United States. Until Conifer High School opened in 1996, the school served students in both Evergreen and Conifer. Evergreen High School is known for being "a school of excellence" in its academic, athletic and extracurricular activities. Evergreen has won two Blue Ribbon Awards from the United States Department of Education in 2007 and 2015.

The entirety of the Evergreen census-designated place is assigned to this school.

History

The first school in the Evergreen area was the Buffalo Park School, which now resides on the grounds of Wilmot Elementary School. In the late 19th century, a frame structure was built one-quarter mile south of Main Street and served as a school until 1923. Located at 4841 County Road 73, the building currently houses Evergreen Bible Church.

Elementary and high school students were housed in the third school built in Evergreen, a red brick two-story structure located at the intersection of County Road 73 and Buffalo Park Road. It was built in 1922 when District 30 became C2, the second consolidation in Jefferson County. An adjacent white masonry building was built in 1944 for the high school and the first class graduated from the newly christened high school in 1948.

The school quickly outgrew its building and a new building was erected southwest of the bus barn at the intersection of Olive Road and Buffalo Park Road, opening in 1954. The building grew through additions as needed, creating a somewhat haphazard layout until the structure was unified with a "main street" layout as part of an addition and remodel in the late 1990s, designed by H+L Architecture.

Students

Demographics
Evergreen High School student demographics in the 2013-2014 school year:
 American Indian/Alaskan Native: 0.2%
 Asian/Pacific Islander: 1.6%
 Black: 0.1%
 Hispanic: 5.2%
 White: 90.6%
 Multiracial: 2.3%

Extracurricular activities
The Cougars are considered to be archrivals of the Conifer High School Lobos, football likely being the most intense sports rivalry between the two schools. The Mountain Bowl is an annual tradition between the two towns. As of 2018, the Cougars have only lost 3 bowl games since its founding in the early 2000s.

Athletics

State championships:

 Boys' cross country: 1965 (III)
 Boys' golf: Chuck Canepa, 1968;  Brett Dean, 1984 & 1986
 Gymnastics: 2008 (4A), 2011 (4A)
 Poms: 1996 (4A), 1998 (4A), 2001 (4A), 2002 (4A), 2003 (4A), 2005 (4A)
 Boys' soccer: 1989 (unclassed), 2015 (4A)
 Girls' soccer: 1990 (unclassed), 1997 (4A)
 Girls' swimming: 2013 (4A), 2014 (4A), 2015 (4A), 2018 (3A), 2019 (3A) 
 Boys' track and field: 1968 (AA)
 Volleyball: 1976 (AAA), 1978 (AAA), 1979 (AAA), 1980 (AAA), 1981 (AAA), 1982 (AAA), 1983 (4A), 1984 (4A), 1985 (4A)
 Girls' Basketball: 2017 (4A), 2018 (4A)

Mentors in Violence Prevention
Following the Columbine shooting, Jefferson County Schools hired Jackson Katz, co-founder of the Mentors In Violence Prevention program, to adapt the collegiate program for high schools. Evergreen High School was chosen as the pilot school for the project. Its success led the program to other schools in the district, then to schools in other states.

Mock trial
Evergreen High School's Mock Trial team have been the state champions in 1988, 1989, 1990, 1992, and 2007. The team won the National High School Mock Trial Championship in 1990 and returned to the national competition again in May 2007, placing 10th.

Notable alumni

 Jeff Ashby (1972) – Space Shuttle astronaut
 Brandon Barnes (1997) – drummer for Rise Against
 Shane Bertsch (1988) – PGA Tour member
 Brock Burke (2014) – Major League Baseball pitcher
 Ronnie Cramer (1975) – film director
 Griffin Dorsey (2017) – Major League Soccer player (Toronto FC)
 Kevin Kouzmanoff (1999) – Major League Baseball player
 Trey Parker (1988) – South Park co-creator
 Pat Porter (1977) – Olympic 10,000-meter runner 
 Jamin Winans (1995) – filmmaker

References

External links

 

Public high schools in Colorado
Educational institutions established in 1944
Jefferson County Public Schools (Colorado)
Schools in Jefferson County, Colorado
1944 establishments in Colorado